It's Raining Today: The Scott Walker Story (1967–70) is a compilation album of songs by the American-born British singer-songwriter Scott Walker, released on October 15, 1996 on Razor & Tie. The album consists of seventeen songs taken from Walker's first five studio albums, and was Walker's first solo album to be released in the United States. Marshall Crenshaw compiled the album's tracks and spent a year and a half convincing Razor & Tie to release it.

Critical reception
In a review of It's Raining Today for the New York Times, Neil Strauss wrote, "Though the collection may seem schmaltzy to the casual listener, further exploration unveils an indelible, melancholy beauty, with each track a rigorously orchestrated excavation into a different recess of human despair and loneliness." Writing in Pitchfork in 2004, Scott Plagenhoef wrote that the compilation was "far too Spartan and scattershot to be recommended". Wilson Neate wrote in Trouser Press that the album "...isn’t quite as solid an introduction as Boy Child, but it does offer a marginally stronger selection of tracks from 'Til the Band Comes In." Robert Christgau gave the album a C− grade, describing Walker as "...Anthony Newley without the voice muscles, "MacArthur Park" as light-programme boilerplate, a male Vera Lynn for late bloomers who found Paul McCartney too r&b."

Track listing

References

1996 compilation albums
Razor & Tie compilation albums
Scott Walker (singer) albums
Albums produced by Johnny Franz